The Cross-Cutting Programs Committee  of the Economic, Social and Cultural Council for the African Union deals with issues not explicitly dealt with by other committees. They are:

 HIV/AIDS.
 International cooperation.
 Coordination with institutions and organs of the African Union.

The Chairperson of the committee is Kalusambo Musonda

Sectoral Cluster Committees of the Economic, Social and Cultural Council